Monsur Ul Karim (1 March 1950 – 5 October 2020) was a Bangladeshi painter.

Education
Karim earned his bachelor's from the Faculty of Fine Arts, University of Dhaka  in 1972, and his masters from the University of Chittagong in 1974.

He was awarded the Ekushey Padak in 2009 by the Government of Bangladesh.

External links

References

1950 births
2020 deaths
People from Rajbari District
University of Dhaka Faculty of Fine Arts alumni
University of Chittagong alumni
20th-century Bangladeshi painters
21st-century Bangladeshi painters
20th-century male artists
21st-century male artists
Recipients of the Ekushey Padak